Towthorpe is a hamlet in the East Riding of Yorkshire, England, it forms part of the civil parish of Fimber.

References

External links

Villages in the East Riding of Yorkshire